SAMPL, which stands for "Stochastic AMPL", is an algebraic modeling language resulting by expanding the well-known language AMPL with extended syntax and keywords. It is designed specifically for representing stochastic programming problems and, through recent extensions, problems with chance constraints, integrated chance constraints and robust optimization problems. 
It can generate the deterministic equivalent version of the instances, using all the solvers AMPL connects to, or generate an SMPS representation and use specialized decomposition based solvers, like FortSP.

Language Features 

SAMPL shares all language features with AMPL, and adds some constructs specifically designed for expressing scenario based stochastic programming and robust optimization.

Stochastic programming features and constructs 

To express scenario-based SP problems, additional constructs describe the tree structure and group the decision variable into stages. Moreover, it is possible to specify which parameter stores the probabilities for each branch of the tree and which set represents the scenario set. Other constructs to easily define chance constraints and integrated chance constraint in an SP problem are available as well.
Using these language constructs allows to retain the structure of the problem, hence making it available to the solvers, which might exploit it using specialized decomposition methods like Benders' decomposition to speed-up the solution.

Robust optimization constructs 

SAMPL supports constructs to describe three types of robust optimization formulations:
 Soyster
 Bertsimas and Sim
 Ben-Tal and Nemirovski

Availability 

SAMPL is currently available as a part of the software AMPLDev (distributed by www.optirisk-systems.com). It supports many popular 32- and 64-bit platforms including Windows, Linux and Mac OS X. A free evaluation version with limited functionality is available.

A stochastic programming sample model 

The following is the SAMPL version of a simple problem (Dakota), to show the SP related constructs. It does not include the data file, which follows the normal AMPL syntax (see the example provided in the AMPL Wikipedia page for further reference).
 
 
 
 
 
 scenarioset Scen;
 
 
 tree Tree := twostage;
 
 
 random param Demand{Prod, Scen};
 
 
 probability P{Scen};	
 
 
 
 
 
 
 
 
 
 
 
 
 
 
  suffix stage 1;
 
 
  suffix stage 2;
 
 
  suffix stage 2;

Solvers connectivity 

SAMPL instance level format for SP problems is SMPS, and therefore the problem can be solved by any solver which supports that standard. One of such solvers (FortSP) is included in the standard SAMPL distribution. Regarding robust optimization problems, the needed solver depend on the specific formulation used, as Ben-Tal and Nemirovski formulation need a second-order cone capable solver.

See also 

 Algebraic modeling language
 AIMMS
 AMPL
 FortSP
 GAMS – General Algebraic Modeling System
 GLPK – free open source system based on a subset of AMPL
 MPS (format)
 Robust optimization
 Stochastic programming

References

External links 
 AMPL home page
 OptiRisk Systems home page

Computer algebra systems
Mathematical optimization software
Numerical programming languages
Mathematical modeling
Text-oriented programming languages
1990 software